Ivonne Reyes (born October 8, 1967 in Valencia, Venezuela) is a Venezuelan actress and TV presenter.

She started as a model and she went later to Miami and finally to Spain, where she became a celebrity thanks to TV programs like the quiz show El precio justo, or soap operas like Hechizo de Amor or La verdad de Laura. She has also taken part in movies like La sal de la vida and Muchacho solitario. On April 3, 2000, she had her first child, Alejandro.

She has a son born April, 2000 that after a paternity lawsuit was legally declared to be son of journalist Pepe Navarro.

In 2007 she was a contestant in the dancing show Mira quien baila.

In 2017, she was a contestant in the fifth edition of reality show Gran Hermano VIP.

Actress

TV series
 Quién da la vez (1995),  Antena 3.
 Este es mi barrio (1996), Antena 3.
 La verdad de Laura (2002), TVE.

Film
Los pájaros se van con la muerte (2011)
Santiago Apóstol (2016)

TV presenter
 El precio justo (1991–1992), TVE, with Joaquín Prat.
 Todo por la pasta (1993), Antena 3, with Sancho Gracia.
 La batalla de las estrellas (1993–1994), Telecinco, with Bertín Osborne.
 Ta tocao (1994), Antena 3.
 El gran juego de la oca (1994–1995), Antena 3, with Pepe Navarro.
 La noche prohibida (1996), Antena 3, with José Coronado and Enrique del Pozo.
 El verano de tu vida (2005), TVE, with Jorge Fernández and Miguel Nadal.
 ¡Hagamos el humor! (2005), Canal Sur, with Guillermo Summers.
 Verano de campeones (2007), Antena 3
Tensión sin límite (2011), Veo Televisión

References

External links
Official web

1967 births
Living people
People from Valencia, Venezuela
Venezuelan television actresses
Venezuelan television presenters
Venezuelan emigrants to Spain
Venezuelan female models
Venezuelan women television presenters